Hristoforos Hoidis (born 10 September 1978) is a Greek sprinter who specialized in the 100 metres.

He competed at the 2004 Olympic Games and the 1999 World Championships, but did not reach the final.

His personal best time was 10.14 seconds, achieved in June 2004 in Plovdiv. This ranks him third among Greek 100 metres sprinters, only behind Angelos Pavlakakis and Aristotelis Gavelas.

In 2005 Hoidis was found guilty of doping. He received an IAAF suspension from July 2005 to July 2007.

Honours

References 
 

1978 births
Living people
Greek male sprinters
Athletes (track and field) at the 2004 Summer Olympics
Olympic athletes of Greece
Doping cases in athletics
Greek sportspeople in doping cases
20th-century Greek people